Pyatovskaya is a rural locality (a village) and the administrative center of Pyatovskoye Rural Settlement, Totemsky District, Vologda Oblast, Russia. The population was 109 as of 2002. There are 2 streets.

Geography 
Pyatovskaya is located 1 km northwest of Totma (the district's administrative centre) by road. Totma is the nearest rural locality.

References 

Rural localities in Totemsky District
Totemsky Uyezd